Boothroyd is a settlement in the Fraser Canyon region of British Columbia, just north of Boston Bar-North Bend. It sits on a flat, alluvial bench which is some of the only flat land in the Fraser Canyon.  It was the site of a Cariboo Roadhouse, run by a man named Boothroyd. Later it was a camp for Canadian Pacific Railway Chinese construction workers from 1882 to 1884.

The community was named after George Boothroyd (1829-1902).  He and his brother kept a roadhouse here during the days of the Cariboo Road.

See also
Boothroyd First Nation

References

Settlements in British Columbia
Populated places on the Fraser River
Fraser Canyon